MRB Productions is a film and television production company focused on independent features, television shows, television specials, and commercials.

Filmography

Awards

2013

The Truth About Emanuel is chosen as an official Sundance Selection.

2012

The Confession (TV series) wins Webby for Best Drama.

The Confession (TV series) wins Webby for People's Voice Award.

2011
 
MRB was nominated for an Emmy for the 2011 NBA Draft Open featuring Adele.

MRB wins New York Festivals World Medal for 2011 NBA Draft Tease.

2010

MRB received two Emmy nominations for the 2010 NBA Draft Open featuring the music of Michael Buble.

2008

2008 International Broadcasting Award for 2007 NBA Finals Open

2007

In 2007, MRB Productions received six Sports Emmy nominations, including recognition of MRB Directors Mark Teitelman and Rico Labbe. MRB scored all four nominations in the "Outstanding Production Design/Art Direction" category. All four nominated pieces were produced in part by MRB Productions, which guarantees a win in the category. The nominated pieces include:
 The 2006 NFL Draft on ESPN directed by Rico Labbe
 Monday Night Football teases for the Washington Redskins vs. Minnesota Vikings game and the Green Bay Packers vs. Philadelphia Eagles game both on ESPN
 Monday Night Football transformation open featuring Ben Stiller on ESPN
 NBA Finals tease open on ABC directed by Mark Teitelman
MRB also received two nominations in another category, "Outstanding Open/Tease" which include:
 Super Bowl XL piece  The Places You Will Go featuring Harrison Ford on ABC directed by Mark Teitelman and produced by Matt Brady
 NBA Basketball Hall of Fame piece on ABC directed by Mark Teitelman and produced by Matt Brady, which won the Emmy

2004

MRB was nominated for three Emmy awards in 2004 for their Monday Night Football Opens and won the Emmy for "Outstanding Live Sports Series" for Monday Night Football.

2003

The National Academy of Television Arts & Sciences nominated MRB Productions for three Emmy Awards in 2003, including the award for "Outstanding Opening/Tease" with Monday Night Football’s The Pitch featuring Dennis Hopper and won an Emmy for "Outstanding Production Design/Art Direction" for their Monday Night Football tease.

References

Source Creative, "The Whole Blooming Brady Bunch" 
IMDB Credits 
"I Trust You to Kill Me" 
Shoot Online 
Adweek 

Television production companies of the United States
Film production companies of the United States